Liam Spencer Gordon (born 15 May 1999) is a professional footballer who plays as a defender for League Two club Walsall. Born in England, he represents the Guyana national team.

Club career
Gordon was born in the London Borough of Croydon and played for the youth teams of Fulham and AFC Wimbledon when he was a youngster and subsequently joined Carshalton Athletic. He played for the first team in January 2016 as a sixteen-year-old due to an injury crisis, but was sent off for a second booking in a 7–1 defeat to Ramsgate in the Isthmian League Division One South. He later joined the Dagenham & Redbridge academy and signed his first professional contract with the club on 7 July 2017. He started the 2017–18 season on loan at National League South side Whitehawk and remained there for three months until November. In January 2018, he went on a one-month loan to Isthmian League Premier Division side Hendon along with Joe White.

He made his first team debut for Dagenham on 19 April 2018, scoring the second goal in a 5–3 victory away at Guiseley. In February 2019, he signed a new one-year contract with the option of a further year after an impressive first half of the season.

Bolton Wanderers
On 1 August 2020 he signed for Bolton Wanderers on a two-year deal. His debut came on 5 September in Bolton's first match of the season, a 2–1 home defeat against Bradford in the first round of the EFL Cup. On 17 December 2020 he was loaned to former team Dagenham & Redbridge for a month. He made his second debut two days later when he started against Ebbsfleet United in a 5–2 win in the FA Trophy. On 19 January 2021, the loan was extended to the end of the 2020–21 season. On 3 May 2022, Bolton confirmed that he would be released at the end of his contract.

Walsall
On 25 May 2022, Gordon agreed to join League Two side Walsall on a two-year deal upon the expiration of his Bolton contract. During pre-season he was diagnosed with acute compartment syndrome, which nearly resulted in his leg being amputated. He was able to overcome this life threatening condition and continue his career.

International career
He made his Guyana national football team debut on 6 June 2019 in a friendly against Bermuda, as a starter. He was then selected for the country's 2019 CONCACAF Gold Cup final 23-man squad after it was whittled down from forty players.

Career statistics

Club

Notes

International

Honours
Bolton Wanderers
EFL League Two third-place (promotion): 2020–21

References

External links
 
 

1999 births
Footballers from Croydon
English people of Guyanese descent
Living people
Association football defenders
English footballers
Guyanese footballers
Guyana international footballers
2019 CONCACAF Gold Cup players
Fulham F.C. players
AFC Wimbledon players
Dagenham & Redbridge F.C. players
Carshalton Athletic F.C. players
Hendon F.C. players
Whitehawk F.C. players
Dartford F.C. players
Bolton Wanderers F.C. players
Walsall F.C. players
National League (English football) players
Isthmian League players